Crusoe Creek is a river located in Wayne County, New York. It flows into Seneca River by Montezuma Station, New York.

References

Rivers of Wayne County, New York
Rivers of New York (state)